Mill  Branch of the Patuxent River in Prince George's County, Maryland is part of the Upper Patuxent Watershead.

There is record of a Reuben Ross owning a water mill on the Patuxent River, maybe near this branch. He died in 1722 but willed it to his children and their heirs forever. from Will on 12 Aug 1722 in Annapolis MD...
Ross, Reuben, carpenter, Prince George's Co., 12th Aug., 1722; 21st Jan., 1722. To daus. Mary and Elizabeth, at age of 16 or marriage, and sons Reuben, ex., John and Thomas, personalty. To wife Elizabeth, water mill on branch running through land of James Williams, near n. branch of Patuxent R., during widowhood; shd. she marry, sons to be free at age of 17, and mill afsd. to son Eeuben and hrs. He dying without issue, to sons John and Thomas and their hrs. Residue of estate absolutely. Overseers: Bro.-in-law Thomas Harwood and Wm. Mordant. Test: Ralph Crabb, Richard Duckett, Thos. Brassen. Note: 28th Feb., 1722, widow claims her thirds. 18, 1.

Drainage area
Mill Branch drains 2270 acres including the communities of Evergreen, The Willows,
Evergreen Estates, St. James
Place, Enfield Chase,
Covington, Archstone at
Bowie Town Center, Glen
Allen, Oaktree, Lake Village
Manor, Amber Meadows, and
Pointer Ridge within Bowie, Maryland.

Environmental concerns
The major pollutants in this stream are sediment and excess nutrients (fertilizer from nearby homes).

See also
List of rivers of Maryland

References

Tributaries of the Patuxent River
Rivers of Maryland
Rivers of Prince George's County, Maryland